Cortinarius sanguineus, commonly known as the blood red webcap, is a species of fungus in the genus Cortinarius.

Taxonomy
Austrian naturalist Franz Xaver von Wulfen described the species as Agaricus sanguineus in 1781, reporting that it appeared in the fir tree forests around Klagenfurt and Ebenthal and in October. He noted that it was very pretty but edible. The specific epithet is the Latin word sanguineus, meaning "bloody". Samuel Frederick Gray established Cortinarius as a genus in the first volume of his 1821 work A Natural Arrangement of British Plants, recording the species as Cortinaria sanguinea "the bloody curtain-stool".

Friedrich Otto Wünsche described it as Dermocybe sanguinea in 1877. Most mycologists retain Dermocybe as merely a subgenus of Cortinarius as genetically all the species lie within the latter genus.

It is closely related to Cortinarius puniceus, which grows under oak and beech from England and France.

Description
The dark blood-red cap is convex, and later flattens, measuring 2–5 cm (0.8–2 in) across, its surface covered in silky fibres radiating from the centre. The stipe is usually the same colour as the cap or paler. Long, slim, and cylindrical, it is 3–6 cm high by 0.3–0.8 cm wide. The veil (cortina) and its remnants are red. The gills are adnate. They are initially blood-red, but turn brown upon aging as the spores mature. The purple-red flesh has a pleasant smell. The spore print is rust-coloured, while the oval spores themselves measure 7 to 9 µm by 4 to 6 µm, and are rough.

Cortinarius sanguineus grows in conifer woodlands in autumn. It is edible. Its pigment can be used as a dye for wool, rendering it shades of pink, purple or red.
The major pigments in C. sanguineus are emodin, dermocybin and dermorubin.

See also
List of Cortinarius species

References

External links

sanguineus
Fungi of Europe
Fungi described in 1781
Inedible fungi
Taxa named by Franz Xaver von Wulfen